JWM (Joe's Window Manager) is a lightweight stacking window manager for the X Window System written by Joe Wingbermuehle. JWM is written in C and uses only Xlib at a minimum.  Configuration is done by editing an XML file; no graphical configuration is necessary or supplied.

Support for the following can be added as compile-time options:
PNG, JPG and XPM icons
Xft
Xinerama
FriBidi
The Shape extension

It provides an interface similar to Windows 98 and can support some GNOME, Motif and Extended Window Manager Hints.

JWM is the default window manager used in Damn Small Linux version 4.x, Puppy Linux and SliTaz (< 2.0). It is used also in an edition of Manjaro Linux.

See also

Comparison of X window managers
Fluxbox, Openbox, IceWM and other lightweight window managers

Notes

References

Further reading
 Hagen Höpfner (August 2005) ''Simple AND Light. JWM Window Manager, Linux Magazine, issue 57, pp. 80–82

External links

JWM on Sourceforge

Free software programmed in C
Free X window managers